Triss  is a 2002 fantasy novel by Brian Jacques.

Triss may also refer to:

Triss Merigold, a character from The Witcher saga
A brand of Svenska Spel, Sweden
Triss King, a former drummer for A Witness, an English post-punk/indie rock band
Triss Duncan, the bass for The Hurricanes
TRISS, Trauma and Injury Severity Score